The 1981–82 Macedonian Republic League was the 38th since its establishment. FK Pelister won their 4th and last championship title.

Participating teams

Final table

External links
SportSport.ba
Football Federation of Macedonia 

Macedonian Football League seasons
Yugo
3